Glenea indiana is a species of beetle in the family Cerambycidae. It was described by James Thomson in 1857, originally under the genus Stibara. It is known from India, Myanmar, Bhutan, Malaysia, and Nepal.

References

indiana
Beetles described in 1857